Argyresthia canadensis, the Canadian arborvitae leafminer or cedar leafminer, is a moth of the family Yponomeutidae. It is found in North America.

There is one generation per year.

The larvae feed on Thuja occidentalis. They have a green body, a dark brown head and a central brown patch on the prothoracic shield and anal plate. They reach a length of up to 7 mm. Nearly full-grown larvae overwinter in mined foliage. Full-grown larvae can be found from April to June. Pupation takes place in a whitish, spindle-shaped cocoon that is made outside of the mine on the foliage.

References

External links
 Info at Forestpests

Argyresthia
Moths of North America
Moths described in 1972